It's Never Too Late is an album by jazz bassist Monk Montgomery, released in 1969 on Chisa Records/Motown Records.  It is the first of his four solo albums, and features members of The Crusaders.
 
A 7" single was released of "A Place in the Sun"/"Your Love" on Chisa Records.

Track listing
"Big Boy" (Wayne Henderson, Arthur Adams) – 5:44    arranged by Dale Frank, Wayne Henderson 
"Sunday Stroll" (Joe Sample) – 2:38 arranged by Joe Sample
"Can We Talk To You?" (Wilton Felder, Arthur Adams) – 2:19  arranged by Wilton Felder
"Your Love" (Wilton Felder) – 2:22    arranged by Wayne Henderson
"A Place In The Sun" (Ron Miller, Bryan Wells) – 2:45   arranged by Wayne Henderson
"It's Never Too Late" (Monk Montgomery) – 3:18. arranged by Joe Sample
"The Lady" (Dorothy Masuka) – 3:27 arranged by Hugh Masekela
"Bluesette" (Norman Gimbel, Toots Thielemans) – 3:27 arranged by Frank Kavelin
"My Cherie Amour" (Henry Cosby, Sylvia Moy, Stevie Wonder) – 3:11 arranged by Wayne Henderson
"How High The Moon" (Nancy Hamilton, Morgan Lewis) – 4:50 arranged by Dale Frank, Wayne Henderson

Personnel
Monk Montgomery - electric bass
Donn Landee, Jud Phillips - engineer
Directed by Stewart Levine and Wayne Henderson
Barry Feinstein, Tom Wilkes - design, photography

References

Monk Montgomery albums
1969 debut albums
Motown albums
Albums produced by Stewart Levine
Albums produced by Wayne Henderson (musician)